Oussoubidiagna is a small town and principal settlement (chef-lieu) of the commune of Tomora in the Cercle of Bafoulabé in the Kayes Region of south-western Mali.

References

Populated places in Kayes Region